Scaphinotus is a genus of beetles in the family Carabidae. There are at least 60 species, all native to North America. They eat snails and are generally limited to the moist environments where snails live. These beetles are flightless.

Species
These 59 species belong to the genus Scaphinotus:

 Scaphinotus aeneicollis (Beutenmüller, 1903)
 Scaphinotus andrewsii (T.W.Harris, 1839)
 Scaphinotus angulatus (T.W.Harris, 1839)
 Scaphinotus angusticollis (Mannerheim, 1823)
 Scaphinotus behrensi (Roeschke, 1907)
 Scaphinotus bilobus (Say, 1823)
 Scaphinotus bullatus Van Dyke, 1924
 Scaphinotus cavicollis (LeConte, 1859)
 Scaphinotus cordatus (LeConte, 1853)
 Scaphinotus crenatus (Motschulsky, 1859)
 Scaphinotus cristatus (T.W.Harris, 1839)
 Scaphinotus debilis (LeConte, 1853)
 Scaphinotus elevatus (Fabricius, 1787)
 Scaphinotus fissicollis (LeConte, 1853)
 Scaphinotus guyotii (LeConte, 1863)
 Scaphinotus hatchi Beer, 1971
 Scaphinotus hoffmani (Barr, 2009)
 Scaphinotus hubbardi (Schwarz, 1895)
 Scaphinotus imperfectus (G.Horn, 1861)
 Scaphinotus incompletus (Schwarz, 1895)
 Scaphinotus infletus Allen & Carlton, 1988
 Scaphinotus interruptus (Ménétriés, 1843)
 Scaphinotus irregularis (Beutenmüller, 1903)
 Scaphinotus johnsoni Van Dyke, 1924
 Scaphinotus kelloggi (Dury, 1912)
 Scaphinotus liebecki Van Dyke, 1936
 Scaphinotus lodingi (Valentine, 1935)
 Scaphinotus longiceps Van Dyke, 1924 (Humboldt ground beetle)
 Scaphinotus macrogonus Bates, 1891
 Scaphinotus mannii Wickham, 1919
 Scaphinotus marginatus (Fischer von Waldheim, 1820)
 Scaphinotus merkelii (G.Horn, 1890)
 Scaphinotus mexicanus (Bates, 1882)
 Scaphinotus obliquus (LeConte, 1868)
 Scaphinotus oreophilus (Rivers, 1890)
 Scaphinotus parisiana Allen & Carlton, 1988
 Scaphinotus petersi Roeschke, 1907
 Scaphinotus punctatus (LeConte, 1859)
 Scaphinotus regularis (LeConte, 1884)
 Scaphinotus reichlei (Barr, 2009)
 Scaphinotus relictus (G.Horn, 1881)
 Scaphinotus ridingsii (Bland, 1863)
 Scaphinotus riversi (Roeschke, 1907)
 Scaphinotus rugiceps (G.Horn, 1872)
 Scaphinotus schwarzi (Beutenmüller, 1913)
 Scaphinotus snowi (LeConte, 1881)
 Scaphinotus striatopunctatus (Chaudoir, 1844)
 Scaphinotus subtilis (Schaum, 1863)
 Scaphinotus tenuis (Casey, 1914)
 Scaphinotus tricarinatus (Casey, 1914)
 Scaphinotus unicolor (Fabricius, 1787)
 Scaphinotus unistriatus (Darlington, 1932)
 Scaphinotus vandykei Roeschke, 1907
 Scaphinotus velutinus (Ménétriés, 1843)
 Scaphinotus ventricosus (Dejean, 1831)
 Scaphinotus viduus (Dejean, 1826)
 Scaphinotus violaceus (LeConte, 1863)
 Scaphinotus webbi Bell, 1959
 † Scaphinotus serus (Scudder, 1900)

References

External links

 

Carabinae
Carabidae genera